Morning Star is a Philippine morning talk show that aired on ABS-CBN. It replaced Good Morning, Kris, and ran from October 11, 2004 to January 28, 2005. The talk show was hosted by various ABS-CBN artists. It also served as the first talk show to be hosted by more than one artist from ABS-CBN. Since the show only served as a Christmas special which is meant for only a mere 3 months, it was replaced by another talk show Homeboy, which was solely hosted by Boy Abunda.

References

See also
List of programs aired by ABS-CBN

2004 Philippine television series debuts
2005 Philippine television series endings
ABS-CBN original programming
Philippine television talk shows
Filipino-language television shows